The 2011–12 Leinster Rugby season was Leinster's eleventh season competing in the Pro12, they also competed in the Heineken Cup which they won for the second consecutive year. The Leinster 'A' team however were knocked out of the British and Irish Cup by Munster A in the semi-final.

Squad

Coaching and management team

Playing squad 2011/2012

In for 2011–12
  Matt Berquist from  Crusaders
  Seán Cronin from Connacht
  Jamie Hagan from Connacht
  Steven Sykes from  Sharks
  Fionn Carr from Connacht
  Damian Browne from  Brive
  Nathan White from  Chiefs
  Leo Auva'a from Old Belvedere
  Brad Thorn from  Fukuoka Sanix Blues (Loan)

Out for 2011/12
  Stan Wright to  Stade Francais
  Nathan Hines to  Clermont Auvergne
  Paul O'Donohoe to Connacht
  Shaun Berne to  Calvisano
  Niall Morris to  Leicester Tigers
  Stephen Keogh to Shannon
  Michael Keating to  Doncaster Knights
  Stewart Maguire to Connacht
  Jason Harris-Wright to  Bristol
  Cillian Willis to  Sale Sharks (Loan)
  Ed O'Donoghue to  London Wasps
  Eoin Sheriff to  Saracens
  Dave McSharry to Connacht
  Shane Horgan retired in March 2012 due to injury; he had not played in the 2011–12 season.

Pre-season

Fixtures

RaboDirect PRO12

Table

Fixtures

Playoffs

Semi-final

Final

Heineken Cup

Pool Table

Fixtures

Pool Stage

Quarter-final

Semi-final

Final

Player statistics

Squad
Last updated 9 June 2012

Key:
 = Appearances,
 = Tries,
 = Yellow card,
 = Red card

British & Irish Cup

Pool Stage

Fixtures

Pool Stage

Quarter-final

Semi-final

References

External links
Official website

2011-12
2011–12 Pro12 by team
2011–12 in Irish rugby union
2011–12 Heineken Cup by team